Events from the year 1748 in Denmark.

Incumbents
 Monarch – Frederick V
 Prime minister – Johan Ludvig Holstein-Ledreborg

Events
 18 December – Niels Eigtved's new theatre of Kongens Nytorv in Copenhagen opens with a repertoire of Danish plays and Italian operas.
 27 December – Ernst Henrich Berling receives a license to publish newspapers.

Undated
 Lauritz de Thurah publishes Hafnia Hodierna.
 Frederik Christian Eilschov publishes Philosophiske Breve.

Births
 11 March – Christian Ditlev Frederik Reventlow, statesman and reformer (died 1827)
 Amalie Sophie Holstein, noble and courtier (died 1823)

Deaths
 19 February – Hans Gram, academic and historian (born 1685)
 26 May – Friederich Ehbisch, sculptor (born 1672)

References

 
1740s in Denmark
Denmark
Years of the 18th century in Denmark